Innominate (from  "nameless") may refer to:

The brachiocephalic artery
The brachiocephalic veins
The three large bones which form the hip bone
An innominate contract, Latin contractus innominatus; in Roman law, a contract that does not fall within any of the regular types of contract
An innominate or anonymous jury, where the identity of the jury members is not publicly known
 Innominate (album), by Off Minor, 2004
 The Innominate, a mountain in the Bighorn Mountains, Wyoming, US

Innominata, from the same root, is used in:
Substantia innominata, a part of the brain
Iris innominata, a flower